Sergio Carreira Vilariño (born 13 October 2000) is a Spanish footballer who plays as a right back for Villarreal CF B, on loan from RC Celta de Vigo.

Club career
Carreira was born in Vigo, Galicia, and joined RC Celta de Vigo's youth setup in 2012, from Coruxo FC; a forward, he was converted into a right back during his formation. He made his senior debut with the reserves on 25 November 2018, coming on as a second-half substitute for Jacobo in a 0–2 Segunda División B away loss against Internacional de Madrid.

Carreira made his first team – and La Liga – debut on 17 October 2020, starting in a 0–2 home loss against Atlético Madrid. He scored his first goal in the category nine days later, netting the equalizer in a 1–1 away draw against Levante UD.

On 20 July 2021, Carreira renewed his contract with the Celestes until 2025, and was loaned to Segunda División side CD Mirandés for the season. On 6 August of the following year, he moved to fellow league team Villarreal CF B also in a temporary deal.

Career statistics

Club

References

External links

2000 births
Living people
Footballers from Vigo
Spanish footballers
Association football defenders
La Liga players
Segunda División players
Segunda División B players
Celta de Vigo B players
RC Celta de Vigo players
CD Mirandés footballers
Villarreal CF B players
Spain under-21 international footballers